Launch Housing is a secular Melbourne-based community organisation that delivers homelessness services and housing supports to disadvantaged Victorians.

The organisation formed from the merger of Hanover Welfare Services and HomeGround Services, on 1 July 2015. Like its predecessors, Launch Housing provides housing and support, as well as advocates for social policy change, advocacy, research and innovation.

History

Hanover
Hanover was founded in 1964 as one of the first specialist homeless support agencies in Melbourne.  The name was taken from Hanover Street in Fitzroy, where the organisation was first based.

Hanover’s founders were clear that it was to be an agency different from other homelessness service providers. It was to be an organisation driven by evidence and one which recognised its clients as active citizens, with dignity, aspirations, talents and strengths.  It was also to be an agency which led change.

Reflecting the social and policy movements under which it was formed, Hanover was established with no structural links to governments, churches or institutions and incorporated as a non-profit company managed by a board of directors. Initially its primary focus was support for homeless men in the inner city. Over the past 45 years this scope has broadened significantly and our work now covers Victorians of all ages and life stages.

Research has always been at the core of Hanover’s work, evidence of this can be found in the following extract from the findings of the Interim Committee which established Hanover in 1964:

Much exact information is required as a basis for planning further work with the men. The methods of the agency should be regarded as experimental, and results evaluated and reported. Clients case records would be compiled so as to allow elucidation of common patterns, and special study might be made of such subjects as excessive drinking and employment difficulties.

In 1969, under the leadership of Bob U’Ren, Hanover began a campaign against the closure of Gordon House, at that time a 400 bed commercial common lodging house for homeless men.

The early 1970s also saw a small number of women beginning to use homeless services set up for men. In 1972 Hanover was incorporated under the Companies Act, and our charter was changed to include women and families – widening the range of services provided. In 1972 management of Gordon House was taken over by Hanover until it was decommissioned in 1976.

In 1976 Hanover opened the new Gordon House at 20 Lorimer Street in Melbourne.  New Gordon House was a revolutionary development, providing clients experiencing homelessness with a higher standard of accommodation than was previously available, and plenty of individual freedom.

The 1980s saw a sustained focus on providing services that addressed the specific needs of people experiencing homelessness, including the establishment of the joint Commonwealth and State Government funded Supported Accommodation Assistance Program. This led to a period of expansion of support and programs delivered by Hanover.

Under new leadership in the early 1990s, Hanover was restructured, and funding from the State and Federal Governments enabled the redevelopment of Gordon House. During this time specific services were developed targeting the particular needs of families, single women and young adults. At the same time, Hanover’s research focus was strengthened, and Michael Horn was appointed as Hanover Research Manager in 1991.

In the late 1990s, drug use amongst residents at Melbourne’s major Crisis Accommodation Centres had reached epidemic levels, prompting Hanover to spearhead a major trial of new strategies to provide support to clients using drugs. Funded by the Victorian Government, the Homeless Drug Dependency Program was a revolutionary shift in supporting people experiencing homelessness out of drug dependency.

In recent years Hanover has added Employment Services to the suite of services provided, helping people who are unemployed build their skills and get back into the workforce.  With education an increasing focus for Hanover, a range of innovative programs are delivered across sites supporting clients to engage in education and training.

HomeGround Services

HomeGround Services was formed in December 2002 from the merger of two like-minded organizations to combine the housing experience of Argyle Street Housing and the support and outreach experience of Outreach Victoria. It was a homelessness, housing and support agency working to end homelessness in Melbourne, Victoria, Australia. It was part of the Australian Common Ground Alliance, which is affiliated with Common Ground (NYC). HomeGround Services has offices were in Collingwood, Victoria; Preston, Victoria; St Kilda, Victoria; Prahran, Victoria; and at Elizabeth Street Common Ground in the CBD.

HomeGround Services’ vision to work towards ending homelessness in Melbourne coincides with recent federal and state progress in this direction. The Australian Government has released its White Paper on Homelessness, which includes targets for reducing the number of people who are homeless, and the Victorian Government committed to a new Victorian Homelessness Strategy. However, a number of factors continue to contribute to homelessness including:

	Housing affordability.
	Family and other crises. 
	 A limited supply of, and poor access to, affordable and supportive housing.

Clients
HomeGround Services worked with a diverse range of clients including those referred from mainstream health organizations, the mental health sector, criminal justice, child protection and others. Its practices, approaches and models in dealing with its clients are based on international best practice on homelessness.

Client numbers
Annually, HomeGround Services provided:
	Assistance to 9000 homeless households in crisis or at risk of homelessness to find shelter and long-term housing.
	Management of around 330 transitional housing properties.
	Support to more than 700 public housing households in order to prevent eviction.

Activities
HomeGround Services worked in the areas of homelessness, housing, support services and social change advocacy.

Its services included:
       Crisis housing advice service (Initial Assessment and Planning) 
       Housing Outreach Worker program 
	Justice Housing Support Program
	Mental health programs including ConnectED and the Housing Mental Health Pathways Program 
       Outreach programs 
	Private Rental Access Program
	Private Rental Management Program 
	Social Housing Advocacy and Support Program 
	Supportive Housing Development 
       Tenancy and Property program 
	Advocacy

HomeGround Services was a partner in the  Elizabeth Street Common Ground (Melbourne, Australia) supportive housing project that aimed to deliver more than 131 homes based on the Common Ground model in Elizabeth Street, central Melbourne in October 2010. HomeGround Services will provide the associated health, training, support and employment services to be located on the site.

In 2009 HomeGround Services joined with 40 other organizations in Call this a home? campaign for safe rooming houses in Victoria, advocating for reform of Victoria’s private rooming house sector.

HomeGround Services won the tender for Victoria's Melbourne Street to Home program in partnership with The Salvation Army and working with the Royal District Nursing Service. Melbourne Street to Home is another key model from the Federal White Paper on Homelessness.

In July 2015 it merged with Hanover to become Launch Housing.

Services 
Hanover provides a range of services to people experiencing homelessness, at risk of homelessness or housing crisis. These include:
Crisis Accommodation, Medium term and transitional housing, Support, Early Intervention programs, Education programs, Health, Nutrition and wellbeing programs.

See also
Housing Commission of Victoria
Homelessness in Australia
Supported Accommodation Assistance Program

References 

Organisations based in Melbourne
Homelessness in Australia
Non-profit organisations based in New South Wales